The following radio stations broadcast on AM frequency 1550 kHz: 1550 AM is a clear-channel frequency reserved for Canada. Class A CBEF in Windsor, Ontario, broadcasts on 1550 kHz.  Clear-channel status had also been shared with XHRUV in Jalapa, Veracruz, Mexico, but that station switched to FM only, with the AM station now silent.  See also List of broadcast station classes.

Argentina
 LT 23 in San Genaro, Santa Fe
 LT 40 in La Paz, Entre Rios
 LT 32 in Chivilcoy, Buenos Aires
 Estación 1550 in Buenos Aires
 La Amistad in José C. Paz
 Popular in José León Suárez

Canada
Stations in bold are clear-channel stations.

Mexico
 XEBG-AM in Tijuana, Baja California
 XENU-AM in Nuevo Laredo, Tamaulipas
 XEREL-AM in Morelia, Michoacán

United States

References

External links

 FCC list of radio stations on 1550 kHz

Lists of radio stations by frequency